Lincoln Grey Quillian is an American sociologist. He is currently a professor in the Department of Sociology at Northwestern University, where he is also a faculty fellow at the Institute for Policy Research. His work focuses on social stratification, racial segregation, and racial attitudes. For example, he was the lead author of a 2017 meta-analysis which showed that rates of discrimination against African Americans in field experiments had not significantly changed since 1989.

Quillian was awarded a Guggenheim Fellowship in 2019.

Education
Quillian received his B.A. in sociology from The University of Chicago in 1991. He then received his M.A. and Ph.D. from Harvard University in sociology in 1993 and 1997, respectively.

References

External links
Faculty page

Living people
American sociologists
Northwestern University faculty
University of Chicago alumni
Harvard University alumni
Year of birth missing (living people)